Ben Moon (born 13 June 1966) is a rock climber from England. During the late 1980s and early 1990s, Moon, along with climbing partner Jerry Moffatt, moved forward the level of sport climbing, both in the UK and internationally.

Climbing career 
Moon's first officially declared  routes had somewhat controversial names.  The routes were both in France and had been previously attempted for a long time by local climbers.  After climbing them Moon named them after French military disasters, first the Maginot Line, at Volx, and secondly Agincourt, at Buoux.  On 8 June 2015, Moon redpointed the Steve McClure route Rainshadow, at Malham Cove in North Yorkshire, England.

Business ventures 
In 2002, Moon founded his climbing clothing and equipment company, Moon Climbing, after splitting from his previous company, S7. One of Moon Climbing's most popular products is the MoonBoard, an overhanging climbing wall used to train dynamic climbing.

Notable ascents 

 Statement of Youth , Lower Pen Trwyn (UK), first ascent (1984)
 Hubble , Raven Tor (UK), first ascent (1990)
 Voyager (low start) , Burbage (UK), first ascent (2006) 
 Rainshadow , Malham Cove (UK), repeat ascent (2015)

Filmography
 One Summer, Bouldering In The Peak (1994)
 The Real Thing (1996)
 Hard Grit (1998)
 Stick it (2001)
 Stone Love (2001)
 Winter Sessions (2006)

Bibliography

See also
List of grade milestones in rock climbing
History of rock climbing
Ron Fawcett

References

External links 
 
 IFSC Profile

British rock climbers
1966 births
Living people